In Mandaeism, Sin or Sen is the Mandaic name for the Moon. Sin is one of the seven planets, who are part of the entourage of Ruha in the World of Darkness.

In Mandaean astrology, Sin is associated with miscarriages and abnormal births. Other Mandaean names for Sin include Agzʿil, Ṭaṭmʿil, Ṣaurʿil, and Sira. Sin's name is derived from the Akkadian Sīnu.

Chapter 53 of the Mandaean Book of John (also in Right Ginza 15.4) is about Sin.

References

Planets in Mandaeism
Moon in culture